Abdul Razak Baginda (born 6 February 1960) is a former political analyst from Malaysia, and close associate of former Malaysian Prime Minister Najib Razak. He became prominent in 2006 when he was charged with abetting the murder of a Mongolian woman. He was acquitted on October 31, 2008 when the Malaysian High Court judge found no prima facie case against him. He continued writing while in prison, where he was remanded in custody and published a book on foreign affairs that was started during his incarceration.

Early life and career 
Baginda is the son of the National Welfare and Social Development Council chairman Dr Abdullah Malim Baginda and Rohana Abdullah. He graduated with a bachelor's degree in politics and government from City Polytechnic, London in 1982. He continued to study and gained a master's degree in War Studies at King's College London in 1984. He subsequently began a D. Phil in International Relations at Trinity College, Oxford, which he successfully completed.

In 1988, Baginda joined the Malaysian Armed Forces Defense College as a lecturer and eventually as the head of strategic studies. In 1993, he formed a think tank called the Malaysian Strategic Research Centre, which is based in Kuala Lumpur. It is responsible for the publication of many books on topics that include international relations. They regularly organise seminars on myriad local and international issues. He is also known to be an adviser to Najib Razak.

Shaariibuugiin Altantuyaa Murder Trial

The French courts are investigating allegations of corruption in the purchase of two  submarines and one Agosta-class submarine from French naval dockyards unit, Direction des Constructions Navales International (DCNI), by the Malaysian Ministry of Defense in 2002. The $2 billion deal was brokered by Baginda who was at that time a defense analyst at the Malaysian Strategic Research Centre think-tank. The investigation is looking into bribes of $200 million involving companies belonging to Baginda and his family members, namely Perimekar, KS Ombak Laut Sdn Bhd and Terasasi (Hong Kong) Sdn Bhd. Shaariibuugiin Altantuyaa, a Mongolian woman hired as a French translator to facilitate the purchase of the submarines and mistress to Baginda, was found murdered after she demanded a $500,000 commission on the deal. Baginda was acquitted of the charge of conspiracy of the murder of Altantuyaa by the Malaysian courts, and the father of Altantuyaa filed a RM100 million civil suit against Baginda, the two policemen accused of her murder and the Malaysian government.

On 1 August 2017, according to a French judicial source, he was charged in France on July 18 with “active and passive complicity in corruption” and “misappropriation of corporate assets”. Four others including two former DCNI chairmen, Philippe Japiot and Dominique Castellan, and two former heads of Thales International Asia (Thint Asia), Bernard Baiocco and Jean-Paul Perrier were also charged.

On August 23, 2018, the Shah Alam High Court allowed the government's application to strike out the suit filed by the family of Altantuyaa against the two police officers, the Malaysian government and Baginda. The Court of Appeals overturned that decision on March 14, 2018. On September 6, 2018, the federal government agreed to hear the government's leave to appeal against the Court of Appeal's decision to reinstate the lawsuit.

Personal life 
He is married to Mazlinda, a lawyer from Lincoln's Inn and former magistrate and they have one daughter, Rowena Abdul Razak Baginda born in 1987.

After his acquittal in the murder trial of Altantuyaa, Abdul Razak headed to the United Kingdom to receive a degree at Oxford University.

Publications 
Books written and edited by Abdul Razak Baginda:

 Alliance of the proxies : USSR–Vietnam relations and the implications / by Abdul Razak A. Baginda and Rohana Mahmood – 1988
 Gorbachev And The Asia Pacific Region – August 1990
 Malaysia's defence & foreign policies / foreword by Mohd. Najib Tun Razak; edited by Abdul Razak Abdullah Baginda, Rohana Mahmood – 1995
 Asia in the 21st century : emerging thoughts & philosophy of an Asian century / edited by Abdul Razak Abdullah Baginda – 1996
 Asia-Pacific's Security Dilemma: Multilateral Relations Amidst Political, Social and Economic Changes – Dec 1998 
 Civic education for civil society / edited by Murray Print, James Ellickson-Brown, Abdul Razak Baginda
 Malaysia In Transition: Politics And Society – Dec 2002 
 Sustainable development and the fight against terrorism / edited by Abdul Razak Baginda, Peter Schier – 2002
 Malaysia and the Islamic World – Nov 30, 2004
 Terrorism And Sustainable Development – Sept 30,2005
 Is Malaysia an Islamic state? : secularism and theocracy : a study of the Malaysian constitution / edited by Abdul Razak Baginda and Peter Schier
 Youth leadership : the challenge of globalisation / edited by Abdul Razak Baginda by Youth Leadership : the Challenge of Globalisation – 2005
 Malaysia and East Asia / edited by Abdul Razak Baginda – 2007
 Malaysia's foreign policy : continuity & change / edited by Abdul Razak Baginda – 2009
 Malaysia's defence & security since 1957 – December 17, 2009
 Malaysia at 50 & Beyond – Dec 21, 2009
 Governing Malaysia – Dec 23, 2009

Notes and references 

1960 births
Alumni of King's College London
Alumni of Trinity College, Oxford
Malaysian Muslims
Malaysian people of Malay descent
Malaysian political scientists
Living people